Tal Rousso (born 1959) is a general of the Israel Defense Forces, serving in the reserves. He heads the IDF's Depth Corps. He also served as an MK for the Labor Party.

Rousso was born in kibbutz Hulata in northern Israel and drafted into the IDF in 1978.  He served with the Israeli Air Force special forces unit Shaldag until discharged in 1981, but returned in 1982 to command a squad during the 1982 Lebanon War. That same year he received his officer's ranks, and then continued to advance up the chain of command, spending much of his early career in the special forces.

During the 2006 Lebanon War Rousso served as the Assistant of the Head of the Operations Directorate in special missions. In October 2006 Chief of Staff Dan Halutz recommended Rousso to replace Operations Directorate head Gadi Eizenkot, who had been promoted to head of Northern Command.  Rousso's promotion was subsequently approved by Defense Minister Amir Peretz.

In October 2010, Rousso was appointed as commander of the Southern Command. He oversaw Operation Pillar of Defense, before retiring in April 2013.

During his career Rousso earned a BA in political science from the University of Haifa and an MBA from Tel Aviv University.

References

1959 births
Living people
Israeli generals
Israeli Labor Party politicians
University of Haifa alumni
Tel Aviv University alumni
Members of the 21st Knesset (2019)